Paskenta (Wintun: Paskenti) is a small unincorporated town in Tehama County, California. Historically, it had greater local importance due to the presence of an active lumber mill. The ZIP Code is 96074. The community is inside area code 530 and the Paskenta CDP. The 2010 United States census reported Paskenta's population was 112. Paskenta was originally inhabited by a tribe of Nomlaki people who are now part of the federally-recognized Paskenta Band of Nomlaki Indians.

History
Paskenta was originally inhabited by a Nomlaki tribe. In the Nomlaki (Central Wintun) language, "Paskenta" (paskenti) means "under the hill" or "under the bank". The modern settlement was founded by Americans of European origin ca. 1860. A post office has been in operation there since 1872. The Paskenta Ranchería was established between 1906 and 1909 and is home to the Paskenta Band of Nomlaki Indians.

In 1980, Paskenta became the central inhabited cite within a larger census designated place (CDP), which was named after its host town.

Geography
According to the United States Census Bureau, the CDP covers an area of 1.1 square miles (2.8 km), all of it land.

Demographics
The 2010 United States Census accrued information only about the entire Paskenta CDP, not just the organized community. The census reported that Paskenta CDP had a population of 112. The racial makeup of Paskenta CDP was 95 (84.8%) White, 0 (0.0%) African American, 0 (0.0%) Native American, 0 (0.0%) Asian, 0 (0.0%) Pacific Islander, 8 (7.1%) from other races, and 9 (8.0%) from two or more races. Hispanic or Latino of any race were 19 persons (17.0%).

The Census reported that 112 people in the CDP (100% of the population) lived in households, 0 (0%) lived in non-institutionalized group quarters, and 0 (0%) were institutionalized.

There were 46 households, out of which 10 (21.7%) had children under the age of 18 living in them, 26 (56.5%) were opposite-sex married couples living together, 5 (10.9%) had a female householder with no husband present, 1 (2.2%) had a male householder with no wife present.  There were 4 (8.7%) unmarried opposite-sex partnerships, and 1 (2.2%) same-sex married couples or partnerships. 9 households (19.6%) were made up of individuals, and 4 (8.7%) had someone living alone who was 65 years of age or older. The average household size was 2.43.  There were 32 families (69.6% of all households); the average family size was 2.88.

The population was spread out, with 19 people (17.0%) under the age of 18, 3 people (2.7%) aged 18 to 24, 27 people (24.1%) aged 25 to 44, 39 people (34.8%) aged 45 to 64, and 24 people (21.4%) who were 65 years of age or older.  The median age was 51.0 years. For every 100 females, there were 103.6 males.  For every 100 females age 18 and over, there were 93.8 males.

The homeowner vacancy rate was 0%; the rental vacancy rate was 0%.  78 people (69.6% of the population) lived in owner-occupied housing units and 34 people (30.4%) lived in rental housing units.

Politics
In the state legislature Paskenta is in the 4th Senate District, represented by Republican Jim Nielsen, and in the 2nd Assembly District, represented by Democrat Jim Wood.

References

Census-designated places in Tehama County, California
Census-designated places in California